re-mix is an open-source library (LGPL) hosted on codeplex to bring the mixin technology to C# and Visual Basic.NET.

History 
.NET does not offer multiple inheritance. Nevertheless, in some use cases multiple inheritance support would be helpful for .NET applications. In languages such as Ruby these use cases were solved with mixins.

The company rubicon created a mixin library for the Microsoft .NET Framework  to add multiple inheritance to their own applications.

The mixin library became part of the open source framework re-motion. In March 2011, re-mix has been published on CodePlex as spin-off project of re-motion.

References 

Free software programmed in C Sharp
Software hosted on CodePlex